Olive Virginia Malienafau Nelson (17 August 1911 – 18 
March 1970) was the first Pacific Island graduate of the University of Auckland.

Nelson was born in Samoa, the daughter of Olaf Nelson, a political leader in Western Samoa, and Rosabel Moors. She had two sisters and one brother, although her brother died of influenza in the 1918 epidemic. In 1919 the three sisters were sent to New Zealand to study at an exclusive school in Remuera.

In 1931 Nelson received the Butterworth Prize for the highest law exam results in the university. In 1933 she travelled to Samoa with her sisters and father, and then returned to Auckland to continue her studies. Nelson completed her law degree in 1936 and was admitted to the bar the same year. Following her graduation, she returned to Samoa and became the country's first female barrister and solicitor.

In 1939 she won the Western Samoan mixed doubles tennis championship with future Minister of Finance Fred Betham, who she went on to marry in 1942. She died in 1970.

See also
List of first women lawyers and judges in Oceania

References

University of Auckland alumni
Samoan lawyers
1911 births
1970 deaths
20th-century women lawyers